The Istanbul Archaeology Museums are a group of three archaeological museums located in the Eminönü quarter of Istanbul, Turkey, near Gülhane Park and Topkapı Palace.

The Istanbul Archaeology Museums consists of three museums: 
Archaeological Museum (in the main building)
Museum of the Ancient Orient
Museum of Islamic Art (in the Tiled Kiosk).

It houses over one million objects that represent almost all of the eras and civilizations in world history.

Background
The origins of the museum can be traced back to the nearby Hagia Irene Church. After the conquest of Istanbul, the church's location close to the barracks of the Janissaries saw it transformed into a de facto 'inner arsenal' for storing their weapons ( İç Cebehane in Turkish). By 1726, during the reign of Sultan Ahmed III, it functioned as a full-fledged armory known as Dar-ül Esliha, or "House of Weapons" in Turkish. By the 19th century, the church was also being used to store the varied artifacts amassed by the Ottoman Empire. 

The Ottoman Sultan Abdülaziz (r. 1861–1876) was impressed by the archaeological museums in Paris (30 June – 10 July 1867), London (12–23 July 1867) and Vienna (28–30 July 1867) which he visited in the summer of 1867, and ordered a similar archaeological museum to be established in Istanbul. It was then, in 1869, that the church and the works in it were inaugurated by decree under the name of "Müze-i Hümayun" (Ottoman Turkish: Müze-i Hümayun or Turkish: İmparatorluk Müzesi). As such, the Istanbul Archaeological Museum is often considered the "first museum of Turkey".

History

Due to space constraints, the museum and its collection was transferred to the Tiled Kiosk (Turkish: Çinili Köşk) between 1875 and 1891. Commissioned by Sultan Mehmed II in 1472 as a pleasure palace, it is the oldest non-religious Ottoman structure in Istanbul and retains a visible Persian influence in its style and architecture It was first opened to the public in 1953 as the Fatih Museum, to showcase Turkish and Islamic art, and was later incorporated into the Istanbul Archaeological Museum.

Appointed to the role in 1881, the first curator and founder of the museum was Osman Hamdi Bey, Painter, Archeologist and son of Ibrahim Edhem Pasha, an Ottoman Grand Vizier. An accomplished artist, in 2019 his painting "Girl Reading the Quran" sold for 6.3 million British pounds, making it the most expensive Turkish painting at that time.

Throughout the 19th century, the existing importance given by the European states to historical artifacts gradually began to be understood by the Ottoman Empire as well. Thereunto arose the issue of establishing a method of regulating these cultural assets. Up to that point in time, 'historical artifacts' in the Ottoman Empire were subject to the common principles of fiqh (Islamic Law). The absence of specific regulations for preserving historical artifacts in effect created a legal void surrounding aspects such as the definition of historical artifacts, along with where and how they would be preserved.

This changed in 1869, when the first set of laws were enacted that outlined the regulation of antiquities. Modern conservation experts refer to this as the first 'protection law' issued by the Ottoman State, focusing on permissions to carry out excavations and related artifact management. According to this law, the owner of land on which an excavation was conducted could claim possession of the finds discovered. While it was illegal to take such relics abroad, they could be bought and sold within domestic borders and the state held the principal right to buy them. With this imperial decree for protecting cultural goods now being enforced, provincial governors throughout the Ottoman Empire would send in found artefacts to the capital city, thus further growing the collection.

With subsequent major finds being discovered shortly thereafter (e.g. excavation of the necropolis of King Sidon in modern-day Lebanon), it soon became clear that a purpose-built building large enough to house the growing museum collection was required.

The construction of the main building was started by Hamdi Bey in 1881, with its official opening held on June 13, 1891. The architect was Alexander Vallaury (who also designed the Pera Palace Hotel in Istanbul). The facade of the building was inspired by the Alexander Sarcophagus and Sarcophagus of the Mourning Women, both housed inside the museum. The inscription in Ottoman Turkish on the pediments of the gates at the entrance of the museum says "Asar-ı Atika Müzesi" (Museum of Antiquities). The tughra on the inscription belongs to Sultan Abdulhamid II. The building is considered by many as the preeminent example of neoclassical style architecture in Istanbul. Upon its 100th anniversary in 1991, the museum received the European Council Museum Award, particularly for the renovations made to the lower floor halls in the main building and the new displays in the other buildings.

The Museum of the Ancient Orient was commissioned by Osman Hamdi Bey in 1883 as a fine arts school. Then it was reorganised as a museum, which opened in 1935. It was closed to visitors in 1963, and reopened in 1974 after restoration works on the interior. Collections are relating to Anatolian (Early Bronze Age, Assyrian Colony Period, Hittite, Neo-Hittite, Urartian, Aramean), Mesopotamian, Egyptian, İran, and Ancient Arabian. Egyptian collection is c. 1200 items that in all kinds of Egyptian Art artifacts. Most of them had come from Dra Abu al Nagar excavations near Karnak excavated by Gautier in 1891. Others are gifts of Hıdivs of Egypt and Ottoman officers.

Gallery

Collection
The ornate Alexander Sarcophagus, once believed to be prepared for Alexander the Great, is among the most famous pieces of ancient art in the museum.

The museum has a large collection of Turkish, Hellenistic and Roman artifacts, many gathered from the vast former territories of the Ottoman Empire. The most prominent artifacts exhibited in the museum include:
Four sarcophagi from the Ayaa necropolis in Sidon:
The Alexander Sarcophagus, found in the necropolis of Sidon
Sarcophagus of the Crying Women (Sarcophagus of the Mourning Women), also found in Sidon (in fact, the sarcophagus of Strato I, king of Sidon)
The Tabnit sarcophagus and the Satrap sarcophagus
The Lycian sarcophagus of Sidon
Glazed tile images from the Ishtar Gate of Babylon
Statues from ancient antiquity until the end of the Roman Era, from Aphrodisias, Ephesus and Miletus
Statue of an Ephebos
Statue of Apollo Citharoedus from Miletus
Parts of statues from the Temple of Zeus found at Bergama
A marble lion from the Mausoleum of Mausolus, one of the few pieces remaining in Turkey 
Snake's head from the Serpentine Column erected in the Hippodrome of Constantinople
Mother-Goddess Cybele and votive stelai
Busts of Alexander the Great and Zeus
Fragments from the temple of Athena at Assos
The Troy exhibit
800,000 Ottoman coins, seals, decorations and medals
One tablet with the oldest known law-collection, the laws of king Ur-Nammu
Two of the three tablets of the Egyptian–Hittite peace treaty (1258 BCE), signed between Ramesses II of Egypt and Hattusili III of the Hittite Empire. It is the oldest known peace treaty in the world, and a giant poster of these tablets containing the treaty is on the wall of the United Nations Headquarters in New York City.
The Saba'a Stele of the Assyrian king Adad-nirari III
Tablet archive containing some 75,000 documents with cuneiform inscriptions, including one containing the oldest known love poem, the Istanbul #2461 tablet
Artifacts from the early civilizations of Anatolia, Mesopotamia, Arabia and Egypt
Siloam inscription, which made headlines in July 2007 when Israel asked for its return
Gezer calendar
Balawat gates (one gate)
Samaria ostraca

See also
Istanbul Mosaic Museum
Museum of Anatolian Civilizations
Turkish and Islamic Arts Museum

References

External links 

Istanbul Archaeological Museums  
Istanbul Archaeology Museum page at the Turkish Ministry of Culture and Tourism website 
Museum of Architecture – Istanbul Archaeology Museum 

Archaeological museums in Turkey
Fatih
Museums established in 1891
Museums in Istanbul
National museums in Turkey
Museums of ancient Greece in Turkey
Museums of ancient Rome in Turkey
Egyptological collections
Museums of Ancient Near East in Turkey
Islamic museums